Jessica Caban  (born June 13, 1982) is an American model, actress and fashion designer. She was a contestant on Model Latina, where she was crowned the first ever Model Latina champion.

Early life
Caban was born to Puerto Rican parents in New York City, and raised in Spanish Harlem.

Career
She began her career in 2002, after being chosen to represent Jennifer Lopez's line "J-LO" as a runner-up in a nationwide search. She was later featured in many commercials, magazines and landed the main role in Proyecto Uno's music video "Holla".

In 2008, Caban auditioned for Sí TV's new reality competition show, Model Latina, in which aspiring models compete against each other in fashion and cultural challenges; it was filmed in Los Angeles. Caban and Darlenis Duran competed in the season finale, where Caban has crowned Sí TV's first Model Latina. She was awarded a $10,000 contract with Q Management and was featured in spreads of magazines.

From 2016 to 2018, Caban played the role of Sonia on the comedy-drama series Jane The Virgin. 

She created and designed the swimwear line J.Marie Swim, that actively operated until 2020, releasing several pieces and campaigns. 

Caban also works as a content creator, focusing on fashion, lifestyle and wellness on her Instagram page.

Personal life 
Since 2011, Caban has been in a longterm relationship with singer Bruno Mars.

Filmography

Awards

Other Sites

External links
 

1982 births
Living people
Actresses from New York City
American female dancers
Dancers from New York (state)
Female models from New York (state)
American women television personalities
American film actresses
Participants in American reality television series
American actresses of Puerto Rican descent